Dennis "D. C." Reid (born 5 August 1952) is a Canadian poet, novelist and short story writer. He also writes about fly fishing, high end automobiles, round the world yacht races and the human brain. The latter subject covers the last fifteen years of human brain science, creativity and how poets do their art.

Born in Calgary, Alberta, he lives in Victoria, British Columbia.

Two of Reid's poetry collections, Love And Other Things That Hurt (1999) and The Hunger (2004) have been nominated for the Dorothy Livesay Poetry Prize.

Reid's two websites are: www.catchsalmonbc.com, and www.dcreid.ca.

Bibliography

Poetry 
The Women Who Surround Me - 1991
Open 24 Hours - 1997 Love and Other Things that Hurt - 1999The Hunger - 2004What It Means To Be Human - 2009

NovelsThe Knife Behind the Gills - 1995

Non-FictionA History of the Salmon Arm Golf Course, 1928-1992 - 1993 (with Todor Davies) How to Catch Salmon - 1995 Maximum Salmon - 2007 Fishing for Dreams: Notes from the Water's Edge - 2005Vancouver Island Fishing Guide - 2008Catch Fish Have Fun - BC's 52 Best Bets - 2011 - Kindle SingleCatch Fish Have Fun - Langara Island BC'' - 2011 - Kindle Single

1952 births
Living people
Writers from Calgary
Writers from Victoria, British Columbia
20th-century Canadian poets
Canadian male poets
20th-century Canadian male writers